I Made Tito Wiratama (born on 31 July 2003) is an Indonesian professional footballer who plays as a central midfielder for Liga 1 club Bali United.

Early life

Tito was born in Denpasar, Indonesia.

Career

Bali United

Tito played for the Bali United youth academy.
On 24 May 2022, Tito officially signed a contract with Bali United. He made his unofficial debut against Persebaya in the 2022 Indonesia President's Cup where he replaced Yabes Roni in the 70th minute. And he finally made his official debut on 18 February 2023 in 2022–23 Liga 1 match against Persebaya Surabaya. He performed brilliantly in his debut match, he managed to give two assists for Bali United, the two assists came on the third goal scored by Privat Mbarga and the fourth goal scored by Ilija Spasojević in the second half. He managed to score his first goal with the club when Bali United beat Persis 3–1 on 27 February 2023.

Career statistics

Club

Honours
Bali United U-18
 Elite Pro Academy Liga 1 U-18: 2021

References

External links
I Made Tito Wiratama at Bali United Official Website

2003 births
Living people
People from Denpasar
Indonesian footballers
Liga 1 (Indonesia) players
Association football midfielders
Sportspeople from Bali
Bali United F.C. players
Balinese people